Martin (Martinho) Maria de Porres Ward, OFM Conv. (born Matthias DeWitte Ward; March 20, 1918 – June 22, 1999) was an African-American Catholic missionary priest who served in Brazil for more than forty years. He was the first African-American to join the Conventual Franciscans and has been proposed as a candidate for sainthood by the Diocese of São João del Rei.

Biography 
Matthias DeWitte Ward was born in the Charlestown neighborhood of Boston, Massachusetts, to William Henry Ward and Clara Irby, an interracial couple. Raised as a Methodist with his twelve siblings, Ward later moved with his family to Washington, D.C., and attended Dunbar High School. He converted to Catholicism at the age of 17 on May 6, 1937 at St. Augustine Catholic Church and was confirmed at the Cathedral of St. Matthew the Apostle on May 30, 1940. He entered the seminary of the Salvatorians in 1942. 

Ward left the seminary due to a pulmonary condition and moved to Brooklyn, New York, where he applied to the Conventual Franciscans. Most U.S. seminaries at the time were closed to Black men due to racism, and Ward was admitted to the Conventuals in June 1945 with the assurance that there were suitable assignments in the order for a Black priest. He was the first African American to join the order.

He took the religious name of Martin Maria de Porres in reference to the famed Black Dominican friar Martin de Porres and the mother of Jesus when he made his first vows. Ward graduated from philosophy studies in 1949 at St. Anthony-on-Hudson Seminary in Rensselaer, New York, and continued his theology studies there in 1950. He was ordained to the priesthood on June 4, 1955, at the Cathedral of the Immaculate Conception in Albany, New York, by Bishop William Scully. Though some of his family members had shunned him for his conversation to Catholicism, two of his sisters attended his ordination. He also baptized his father on his deathbed.

After his ordination, Ward volunteered for the Conventuals' missions in Brazil, a common outcome for African-American Catholic priests of the era. Most Catholic bishops in the United States refused to allow Black priests to serve in their dioceses because of their race. Most of the early African-American priests were ordained for religious communities and were steered toward overseas work. Ward quickly learned Portuguese and became an educator in South America, where he also served as a pastor, chaplain, and vocations director. His work was noticed by his fellow Black priests in the U.S., and Father George Clements included Ward's work in his 1975 book about African-American clergy: Black Catholic Men of God.

In 1985, Ward was transferred from Goiatuba to Andrelândia, where he served as a spiritual director and teacher at a local seminary. He was known to entertain his fellow friars and his students with his sharp sense of humor and storytelling, and he often shared his vocation story and health issues and his struggle against anti-Black racism. In 1995, Ward was awarded the honorary title "Citizen of Andrelândia" for his service in the region.

On June 20, 1999, Ward suffered the characteristic symptoms of a heart attack during Mass but continued the liturgy. He suffered a second myocardial episode en route to Rio de Janeiro a day later and died on June 22.

Legacy 
Spiritual devotion to Ward in Brazil began in earnest following his death, especially in Andrelândia where he had long served. His gravesite at São Francisco de Assis Seminary became a place of pilgrimage and the source of two reputed miracles as of 2022.

The local Conventuals began seeking his canonization in the 21st century and received official permission from Bishop José Eudes Campos do Nascimento of the Diocese of São João del Rei in June 2020. The Conventuals later installed portraits of Ward at each of their local parishes and composed a prayer for his canonization to be recited at all of their Masses. They also maintain a webpage to spread his life story and support his canonization. The cause for sainthood was under review by the order's curia in Rome as of the summer of 2022.

See also 
 Black Catholicism
 Order of Friars Minor Conventual
 Catholic Church in Brazil

References

External links 

 Official webpage

Venerated African-American Catholics
African-American Catholic consecrated religious
Conventual Friars Minor
Brazilian Roman Catholic priests
Roman Catholic missionaries in Brazil
Dunbar High School (Washington, D.C.) alumni
Salvatorians
African-American history of Massachusetts
African-American history of Washington, D.C.
Afro-Brazilian people